Carlos Fernandez Demeneghi (born November 17, 1990 in Xalapa, Veracruz) is a Mexican professional footballer who plays for Murciélagos  of Ascenso MX.

External links
Ascenso MX 

1990 births
Living people
People from Xalapa
Mexican footballers
Irapuato F.C. footballers
Murciélagos FC footballers
Liga MX players

Association footballers not categorized by position